Patssi Valdez (born 1951) is an American Chicana artist. She is a founding member of the art collective, Asco. Valdez's work represents some of the finest Chicana avant-garde expressionism which includes but not limited to painting, sculpture and fashion design. She lives and works in Los Angeles, California.

Early life and education
Valdez was born in 1951 and grew up in East Los Angeles. Valdez recalls that during the time she was growing up in Los Angeles, racism, police brutality and poor schools were a big problem. Valdez attended Garfield High School and graduated in 1970. She received a BFA degree in 1985 from Otis Art Institute (now Otis College of Art and Design).

Career and work

Valdez was a founding member of the Asco artist collective. Valdez started working with Asco right out of high school. She was very involved with street performance art and "cinematic Goth film stills" during the 1970s and 1980s. Valdez relates that during her time in Asco, she had "grand ideas about being a great painter," but she felt lacked the skills she needed to be a successful painter. Instead of painting, she focused on performance art, installations and photography. During her time with Asco, she collaborated and created work that reflected shared "political and social concerns." Many of her performances with Asco took place in areas where there had recently been gang conflict or fatal shootings of individuals by the police. She and the other founders of Asco had seen that a disproportionate number of Mexican-Americans were singled out for the Vietnam draft: this and "the sight of their friends returning in body bags and the elite political class's apathy to their plight scarred all the members." Asco commented on Mexican-American identity and rampant stereotyping of Mexican-Americans by the media. Valdez relates how she was "always angry" as a young person watching movies "because she never saw the beautiful Mexicans she knew on screen."

Valdez' installations are considered feminist works that defy cultural expectations of a woman's role in society. The temporary nature of her installations also tap into the "Mexican cultural practice of the impermanent."

Since the 1980s Valdez has focused on her painting. She honed her skills and invited honest critique of her first works which helped boost her confidence in her painting. Valdez's painting are bright, colorful and "seem just a little enchanted." "I've been trying to get away from the brighter palette for years," she says, "but the more I try, it just comes out." Her "vibrant" work is very emotive and has a sense of magical realism. Valdez's subject matter is often focused on the female figure or domestic scenes and settings. Her work draws on her "private experiences, the nature of which [are] distinctly painful and feminist." Valdez's multi disciplinary Avant Garde practice has encompassed various mediums, including her lesser known works in Fashion Design. Her works in fashion have been part of multiple national and international installations that have exhibited her unique Paper Fashion Designs. It was said that in a 2014 conversation at The University of Nottingham's with Lucy Bradknock Valdez described her relationship with fashion during her time within her  the Asco Chicano Art collective in a way that revealed the importance fashion held in her designs as an expression of the times underlying socio-economic and political concerns as a Chicana Feminist artist.

In 2000, she showed at Patricia Correia Gallery, Santa Monica. In 2006, she showed at the Angels Gate Cultural Center.
In 2011, she showed at Fowler Museum at UCLA.

In 2017 to 2018 she was part of the area wide Pacific Standard Time exhibition, her exhibit Judithe Hernández and Patssi Valdez: One Path Two Journeys. Pacific Standard Time was at the Millard Sheets Art Center. "These artists have profoundly influenced the aesthetic voices of Latinas in the latter half of the 20th century, and for the first time will be shown together."

Awards 
Valdez is the recipient of J. Paul Getty Trust Fund for the Visual Arts fellowship, National Endowment for the Arts fellowship, and the Brody Arts Fellowship in Visual Arts. She won a 2001 Durfee Artist Fellowship.

Collections 
Her art work is included in the museum collections at Smithsonian American Art Museum, National Hispanic Cultural Center collection, National Museum of American Art, the Tucson Museum of Art, the San Jose Museum of Art, The Cheech Marin Center for Chicano Art, Culture & Industry in Riverside, California, and the El Paso Museum of Art.

References

Further reading

External links

Official site
Oral history interview with Patssi Valdez, 1999 May 26-June 2, Archives of American Art
L.A.'s most colorful house? Owner Nely Galán, artist Patssi Valdez paint personality onto canal compound, Los Angeles Times

1951 births
Chicana feminists
Living people
20th-century American painters
21st-century American painters
People from East Los Angeles, California
Otis College of Art and Design alumni
American artists of Mexican descent
20th-century American women artists
21st-century American women artists
American women painters
Painters from California
American performance artists
American women performance artists